Toi or TOI may refer to:

Places 
 Toi, Shizuoka (土肥町 Toi-chō), Japan
 Toi, Niue, a village in Niue
 Toi Market, in Nairobi, Kenya

People and characters 
 Toi (Bible), a Biblical figure
 Toi (Polynesian name), a masculine name in Māori and other Polynesian languages
Toi-te-huatahi, an early Māori explorer 
 Toi (given name)
 Toi (surname)
Ms. Toi, an American rapper
Toi8 (born 1976), a Japanese artist
 Toi, a group of pirates responsible for the Toi invasion of Japan in 1019
 Toi, a contestant in Akademi Fantasia, Season 6

Media and entertainment 
 Toi (band), a group of electronic folk rock musicians in the Philippines
 "Toi" (song), a French-language song, 1975 Eurovision entry for Luxembourg sung by Geraldine
"Toi", single by Hélène Rollès from the album Toi... Émois 
 You (2007 film), known in French as Toi, a 2007 Canadian film

Other uses 
 Toi (programming language)
 , a cultivar of karuka, Pandanus julianettii
 Tonga language (Zambia and Zimbabwe), ISO 639-3 code toi

Acronyms
 T.O.I., The Times of India, an English daily newspaper in India
 TOI, Transiting Exoplanet Survey Satellite (TESS) Object of Interest
 Third-order intercept point, a specification of electronic amplifiers
 Time on ice, an ice hockey statistic
 Theatre on ice, a branch of figure skating

See also 

 Toi Toi, a suburb of Nelson, New Zealand
 Toi toi toi, an English expression
Ton (disambiguation)